Glover is an unincorporated community in Champaign County, Illinois, United States. Glover is located on U.S. Route 150 near the eastern border of St. Joseph.There are no buildings in Glover. There used to be a tower at the Junction of the Chicago and Eastern Illinois, Peoria and Eastern, and the Illinois Terminal railroads. The Peoria and Eastern and the Illinois Terminal have been removed.  Houses nearby belong to St Joseph, Illinois.

References

Unincorporated communities in Champaign County, Illinois
Unincorporated communities in Illinois